John Whetham (1733/4–1796), DD, a graduate of Exeter College, Oxford was Dean of Lismore  from 1791 until 1796: he was also Archdeacon of Cork from 1793 and died  at Clifton, Bristol on 1 May 1796.

References

1796 deaths
Year of birth unknown
Alumni of Exeter College, Oxford
Archdeacons of Cork
Deans of Lismore